The article lists all the 95 community development blocks in the 13 districts of Uttarakhand.

District-wise details

See also
 Administrative divisions of Uttarakhand
 List of districts of Uttarakhand
 List of parganas of Uttarakhand
 List of tehsils of Uttarakhand
 Block (district subdivision)

References
 
 

Blocks
Community development blocks in India